Rooz is the third album by Cornish folk band Dalla. It was released in 2007, also as a download.

Some of the songs in the album are in the Cornish language.

Track listing
 Dean Younk a Gernow (The young man of Cornwall) - Slow duet
  Tane an Gove (The smith's fire) - Fast instrumental 
  Bal Maiden's Chant Fast duet
  King of Sweden - also known as "Marriage may become a curse" - Instrumental faster and faster
  Can Dilly (Dilly song) - Call and response song
  Tansys Golowan (Midsummer bonfire) - Lively instrumental with world music flavour (Tune composed by J. Mills).
  Crantock Games  Slow and thoughtful interpretation for duet
  Descent
  Seventeen Come Sunday - Jolly duet
  Hernen Rooz (Red herring) - Instrumental, with an unusual finish

Personnel
Dalla members
Hilary Coleman - Clarinet, bass clarinet, vocals, whistle, rock smashing
Neil Davey - Bouzouki, mandolin, fiddle, crowdy crawn, vocals, clapping
Bec Applebee - Darabuka, pandera, vocals, clapping, rock smashing
Guests
Genevieve Applebee - rock smashing
Pol Hodge - vocals

References

Dalla albums
2007 albums